Joseph Caputo is the name of:

Joe Cabot (1921–2016), Joseph Caputo, musician
Joseph Caputo (OITNB), fictional character